The 1992 Skoda Czechoslovak Open was a men's tennis tournament played on Clay in Prague, Czech Republic that was part of the International Series of the 1992 ATP Tour.
Karel Nováček successfully defended his title, by defeating Franco Davín 6–1, 6–1 in the final.

Seeds

Draw

Finals

Top half

Bottom half

References

External links
 Official results archive (ATP)
 Official results archive (ITF)

Prague Open (1987–1999)
1992 ATP Tour